William Pulteney may refer to:

William Pulteney (1624–1691), English MP for Westminster
William Pulteney, 1st Earl of Bath (1684–1764), British MP for Hedon and Middlesex, Cofferer of the Household
William Pulteney, Viscount Pulteney (1731–1763), his son, British MP for Old Sarum and Westminster, Lord of the Bedchamber
Sir William Pulteney, 5th Baronet (1729–1805), Scottish lawyer, MP for Cromarty and Shrewsbury
William Pulteney (British Army officer) (1861–1941), British general during the First World War